Loch Frisa (Gaelic: Loch Friosa) is a loch on the Isle of Mull, Inner Hebrides, Scotland. It falls within the Argyll and Bute unitary authority area. The loch runs largely northwest to southeast. Its northwestern end is about halfway between Tobermory and Dervaig. It is the largest loch on the Isle of Mull.

Loch Frisa is considered to be low-altitude, medium-alkalinity and generally deep. It is known for eagle watching.

The ship  was for some time named after Loch Frisa, and Caledonian Maritime Assets purchased a ferry in 2021 that they named .

References

Lochs of Argyll and Bute
Landforms of the Isle of Mull